Mari Djata can refer to:

Sundiata Keita (c. 1217 – c. 1255), also called Mari Djata I, founder of the Mali Empire
Mari Djata II of Mali, mansa of the Mali Empire from 1389 to 1390
Sandaki (mansa), also called Sandaki Mari Djata, mansa of the Malicool Empire from 1389 to 1390